Santhanpara  is a village in Idukki district in the Indian state of Kerala.

Demographics
As of 2011 Census, Santhanpara had a population of 6,782 with 3,357 males and 3,425 females. In Santhanpara, 8.4% of the population was under 6 years of age. Santhanpara had an average literacy of 81.8% higher than the national average of 74% and lower than state average of 94%.

References

Villages in Idukki district